Out of the Snows is a 1920 American silent drama film directed by Ralph Ince and starring Ince, Zena Keefe and Gladys Coburn.

Cast
 Ralph Ince as 	Robert Holliday
 Zena Keefe as 	Anitah
 Pat Hartigan as 	John Blakeman 
 Gladys Coburn as	Ruth Hardy
 Huntley Gordon as 	Sgt. Graham
 Red Eagle as 	Lone Deer
 Jacques Suzanne as 	Antoine Dufresne

References

Bibliography
 Connelly, Robert B. The Silents: Silent Feature Films, 1910-36, Volume 40, Issue 2. December Press, 1998.

External links
 

1920s American films
1920 films
1920 drama films
1920s English-language films
American silent feature films
Silent American drama films
American black-and-white films
Films directed by Ralph Ince
Selznick Pictures films